Kim Eun-jin (born 20 April 1975) is a South Korean former field hockey player. She competed in the women's tournament at the 2000 Summer Olympics.

References

External links
 

1975 births
Living people
South Korean female field hockey players
Olympic field hockey players of South Korea
Field hockey players at the 2000 Summer Olympics
Place of birth missing (living people)
Asian Games medalists in field hockey
Asian Games gold medalists for South Korea
Asian Games silver medalists for South Korea
Medalists at the 1998 Asian Games
Medalists at the 2002 Asian Games
Field hockey players at the 1998 Asian Games
Field hockey players at the 2002 Asian Games
20th-century South Korean women
21st-century South Korean women